Veigar Margeirsson (born 1972) is a film score composer from Iceland. He composed the original score for Eric Schaeffer's 2004 film Mind the Gap. He was also one of the composers who arranged and orchestrated Clint Mansell's Lux Aeterna from Requiem for a Dream for full orchestra and choir for The Lord of the Rings: The Two Towers trailer. The piece, named "Requiem for a Tower", was made exclusively for the trailer and was featured in neither Requiem for a Dream nor The Lord of the Rings film trilogy.

See also 
 Trailer music

Reference

External links
Home page

1972 births
Living people
Veigar Margeirsson
Veigar Margeirsson
Veigar Margeirsson